The national holidays in the Netherlands are:

While there are other holidays that are widely celebrated, these are not officially recognised national holidays. They are as follows:

 While Saint Nicholas's Eve (the eve of Sinterklaas, also called Sinterklaasavond or Pakjesavond) on 5 December is not a national holiday, it is widely celebrated. Saint Nicholas's traditional name day is on 6 December; it is however Saint Nicholas's Eve, the day before, which is the focus of celebrations in the Netherlands.
 In the south and east of the Netherlands, Carnival is celebrated. It is celebrated on the three days before Ash Wednesday. The earliest possible date is on 1 February, the latest possible date is 9 March. Though not an official holiday, many people, particularly in the south, take the week off to celebrate. Schools in both regions schedule their spring holiday at the same time.
 There has been some debate over whether the Islamic holiday of Eid ul-Fitr (Suikerfeest in Dutch, lit. 'Sugar festival') should be a national holiday. This was met by opposition from right-wing political parties such as the PVV and SGP. For now, Eid ul-Fitr is not an official national holiday, but it usually justifies a day off for Islamic employees. Those opposed to this proposition say that there are enough national holidays as it is. Schools are still able to give additional days off for this purpose.

See also
 Public holidays in Belgium
 Public holidays in France

References

External links
On which public holidays are schools closed in the Netherlands? Rijksoverheid (Dutch government)
Calendar - Holiday Files

 
Netherlands
Dutch culture
Society of the Netherlands
Observances in the Netherlands
Holidays